Home Again is the fourth studio solo album by singer Jimmy Somerville, released in 2004. Somerville's previous solo albums were Read My Lips (1990), Dare to Love (1995) and Manage the Damage (1999). Also released was the US only remix E.P., "Root Beer" (2000).

Singles 

 "It's So Good"
 "Come On"
 "Ain't No Mountain High Enough"

Track listing

 "Could It Be Love?" (Felix Gauder, Jimmy Somerville, Milan Sajé) – 03:33
 "Under a Lover's Sky" (Jimmy Somerville, Stefan Fornaro, Tillmann Uhrmacher) – 05:12
 "Come On" (Jimmy Somerville, Peter Plate, Sunniva Greeve, Ulf Leo Sommer) – 03:47
 "It Still Hurts" – 03:32
 "It's So Good" – 03:46
 "Burn" – 04:04
 "Ain't No Mountain High Enough" – 03:50
 "I Will Always Be Around" – 03:41
 "But Not Tonight" – 03:19
 "Amnesia" – 03:54
 "Home Again" – 05:12
 "What's Your Game?" – 05:08
 "Selfish Days" – 05:03
 "Stay" – 05:37

German Album Bonus Tracks
 "Sing It to Your Heart" – (Hidden track after "Stay" and a 7:56 silence)
 "Ain't No Mountain High Enough" (Björn Wilke's Deep Valley Short Edit)

Charts

References

2004 albums
Jimmy Somerville albums